The 1977–78 Danish 1. division season was the 21st season of ice hockey in Denmark. Eight teams participated in the league, and the Rødovre Mighty Bulls won the championship. Gladsaxe SF was relegated.

Regular season

External links
Season on eliteprospects.com

Dan
1977 in Danish sport
1978 in Danish sport